The Stylistics are an American, Philadelphia soul group that achieved their greatest chart success in the 1970s. They formed in 1968, with a lineup of singers Russell Thompkins Jr., Herb Murrell, Airrion Love, James Smith and James Dunn. All of their US hits were ballads characterized by the falsetto of Russell Thompkins Jr. and the production of Thom Bell. During the early 1970s, the group had twelve consecutive R&B top ten hits, including "Stop, Look, Listen", "You Are Everything", "Betcha by Golly, Wow", "I'm Stone in Love with You", "Break Up to Make Up" and "You Make Me Feel Brand New", which earned them 5 gold singles and 3 gold albums.

Career

Early years
The Stylistics were created from two Philadelphia groups, The Percussions and The Monarchs. Russell Thompkins Jr., James Smith and Airrion Love came from the Monarchs, and James Dunn and Herb Murrell came from the Percussions.  In 1970, the group recorded "You're a Big Girl Now", a song their road manager Marty Bryant co-wrote with Robert Douglas, a member of their backing band Slim and the Boys, and the single became a regional hit for Sebring Records. Producer Bill Perry spent $400 to record the song in the Virtue Studios in Philadelphia. The larger Avco Records soon signed the Stylistics, and the single eventually climbed to No. 7 on the US Billboard R&B chart in early 1971.

Success: The Bell/Creed years
After signing to Avco, the record label approached producer Thom Bell, who had already produced a catalogue of hits for The Delfonics, to work with the group. The Stylistics auditioned for Bell, but he was initially unimpressed. He ultimately agreed to produce the group because he believed in the potential of lead singer Russell Thompkins, Jr.'s distinctive, nasal high tenor and falsetto voice. Avco gave Bell complete creative control over the Stylistics and he proceeded to focus the group's sound exclusively around Thompkins's voice. On most of the group hits, Bell would have Thompkins sing virtually solo.

The first song recorded with Bell and his collaborator, lyricist Linda Creed, was "Stop, Look, Listen".

Their hits from this period — distilled from three albums — included "Betcha by Golly, Wow" (U.S. No. 3), "I'm Stone in Love with You", "Break Up to Make Up" (U.S. No. 5), "You Make Me Feel Brand New" featuring Thompkins singing a lead vocal duet with Airrion Love, "Stop, Look, Listen (To Your Heart)", "You Are Everything" and the Top 20 pop chart hit "Rockin' Roll Baby" (U.S. No. 14).  "You Make Me Feel Brand New", the group's biggest U.S. hit, holding at No. 2 for two weeks in 1974, was one of the group's five U.S. gold singles.

The Stylistics also found a path on to adult contemporary airwaves, and the group made Billboard magazine's Easy Listening singles chart twelve times from 1971 to 1976, with three entries ("Betcha by Golly, Wow", "You Make Me Feel Brand New" and "You'll Never Get to Heaven (If You Break My Heart)") reaching the Top 10. Every single that Bell produced for the Stylistics was a Top Ten R&B hit, and several — "You Are Everything", "Betcha by Golly Wow!", "I'm Stone in Love with You", "Break Up to Make Up" and "You Make Me Feel Brand New" — were also Top Ten pop chart hits. The group also enjoyed commercial success with hits with this material throughout Europe.

Changing style: Continuing international success
Thom Bell stopped working with the Stylistics in 1974, and the split proved commercially difficult for the group in the U.S. They struggled to find the right material, although their partnership with label owners Hugo & Luigi as producers and arranger Van McCoy started well, with "Let's Put It All Together" (No. 18 pop, No. 8 R&B) and "Heavy Fallin' Out" (No. 4 R&B, No. 41 pop). Later singles were notably less successful, but as U.S. success began to wane, their popularity in Europe, and especially the United Kingdom, increased. Indeed, the lighter 'pop' sound fashioned by McCoy and Hugo & Luigi gave the group a U.K. No. 1 in 1975 with "Can't Give You Anything (But My Love)". Further successes with "Sing Baby Sing", "Na Na Is The Saddest Word", "Funky Weekend" and "Can't Help Falling in Love" consolidated the group's European popularity. The Stylistics recorded "Disco Baby", "Love is the Answer" and "16 Bars" also. They are one of the few U.S. acts to have two chart-topping greatest hits albums in the U.K.

The Stylistics switched record labels during this period as Avco Records transitioned into H&L Records in 1976. Notwithstanding this, the band began to struggle with increasingly weak material, and although the singles and albums came out as before, by 1978 chart success had vanished; even a move to Mercury in 1978, for two albums produced by Teddy Randazzo, failed to produce any major success. Russell Thompkins Jr. wrote (in the sleevenotes for the re-issue of the 1976 album, Fabulous) that the group began to feel that the music they were recording was becoming dated, and not in keeping with the popular disco sound of the late 1970s.

In 1979, they had a small part in the movie Hair, directed by Miloš Forman, where they play conservative army officers. They double Nell Carter in singing a song called "White Boys".

Later years

In 1980, the group reunited with Thom Bell and signed with Philadelphia International Records subsidiary, TSOP Records. They released the single "Hurry Up This Way Again" that year which brought them back into the R&B Top 20 (peaking at No. 18). Both James Dunn and James Smith departed due to conflicts over the direction of the group; Dunn left before the recording of the album Hurry Up This Way Again (1980) and Smith after the recording of Closer Than Close in 1981. Nevertheless, the group continued, recruiting new member Raymond Johnson, but Johnson departed in 1985, leaving the group as a trio. Love, Murrell and Thompkins continued to tour until 2000, when Thompkins, Jr. left the group.

In 2000, singer Eban Brown (formerly of The Delfonics, The Manhattans, and Ray, Goodman and Brown) replaced Thompkins as lead singer. That same year, tenor singer Van Fields, who had previously sung with the A Cappella group "A Perfect Blend", joined, enabling The Stylistics to grow from a trio back to a quartet. The group was featured live on the DVD The Stylistics Live at the Convocation Center (2006), as well as with other artists of the 1970s on the DVD, 70s Soul Jam.

In 2004, after having left The Stylistics in 2000, former lead singer Thompkins launched his own group called Russell Thompkins Jr, & The New Stylistics, returning with former member Johnson, plus James Ranton and Jonathan Buckson. They were featured on the DVD Old School Soul Party Live!, which was part of the PBS My Music series.

In 2010, they released an album entitled, That Same Way by LAC Management.

In 2011, Fields departed from the group after 11 years, due to creative differences, and was replaced by singer Jason Sharp.

In January 2018, after 18 years with The Stylistics, Brown, who is also a jazz guitarist and composer, announced his departure to concentrate on his solo career. He since performed at venues in the States and overseas as a solo artist. Brown was initially replaced by Michael Muse, and after a few months, he was replaced by former Temptation Barrington "Bo" Henderson.

In 2018, The Stylistics celebrated their 50th. anniversary in the music industry. Their milestone was acknowledged at venues throughout the year during their 50th. Anniversary tour in the States and overseas.

As of 2020, the remaining members of the original group, Love and Murrell were still performing, continuing the Stylistics' legacy with their unit, while Thompkins and his New Stylistics continue to perform as well.

Personnel
Current members
 Airrion Love (1968–Present)
 Herb Murrell (1968–Present)
 Jason Sharp (2011–Present)
 Barrington "Bo" Henderson (2018–Present)

Former members
 Russell Thompkins, Jr. (Lead) (1968 - 2000)
 James Dunn (1968 - 1980)
 James Smith (1968 - 1981)
 Raymond Johnson (1981 - 1985)
 Harold Eban Brown (Lead) (2000 - 2018)
 Van Fields (2000 - 2011)

Discography

Awards and recognition

Inductions
In 1994, The Stylistics were inducted into The Philadelphia Music Alliance Walk of Fame.
The Stylistics were inducted into the Vocal Group Hall of Fame in 2004.

RIAA Gold Certifications
Between January 1972 and August 1974 The Stylistics were awarded 5 gold singles and 3 gold albums.
January 3, 1972 - Single/"You Are Everything". 
April 17, 1972 - Single/"Betcha By Golly Wow".
December 13, 1972 - Single/"I'm Stone In Love With You".
February 16, 1973 - Album/"The Stylistics".
April 6, 1973 - Single/"Break Up To Make Up".
June 14, 1973 - Album/"Round Two".
May 22, 1974 - Single/"You Make Me Feel Brand New".
August 12, 1974 - Album/"Let's Put It All Together".

Film/Television Appearances
The Stylistics television appearances. 
Top of the Pops (TV Series)
The Stylistics appeared 10 times on Top of the Pops between 1972 and 1978. 
Episode #15.14 (1978)
Episode #14.39 (1977)
Episode #14.15 (1977)
Episode #14.13 (1977)
Episode #13.16 (1976)
Top of the Pops '75: Part 2 (1975)
Episode #11.18 (1974)
Episode #11.4 (1974)
Episode #9.42 (1972)
Episode #9.30 (1972)

The Mike Douglas Show (TV Series)
The Stylistics appeared 6 times on the show between 1972 and 1978.
Episode #17.219 (1978) 
Episode #15.217 (1976) 
Episode #15.143 (1976) 
Episode #14.155 (1975) 
Episode #14.40 (1974) 
Episode #12.80 (1972)

The Midnight Special (TV Series)
The Stylistics appeared in 4 episodes of the show. 
4th appearance (1974)
3rd appearance (1973) 
2nd appearance (1973)
1st appearance (1973)

Soul Train TV Series
The Stylistic appeared in 2 episodes of Soul Train.
Episode #10.15 (1984)
Episode #3.27 (1974)

Friday Night with Jonathan Ross (TV Series)
Episode #17.9 (2009)

Showtime at the Apollo TV Series
Episode #17.15 (2004)

Sinbad's "Soul Music Festival: Part 5 1999"
The Stylistics appeared on the TV Special that took place in St. Thomas, Virgin Islands and was aired on HBO

The Vera Lynn Show (TV Series)
Episode #2.1 (1975)

Saturday Night Live TV Series
In 1975, The Stylistics appeared on the 1st season of Saturday Night Live.
Episode #1.8 (1975)

Dinah! TV Series
The Stylistics appeared on the 1st season of The Dinah Shore TV Show.
Episode #1.181 (1974)

Your Hit Parade (TV Series)
Episode #2 (1974)

Don Kirshner's Rock Concert TV Show
Episode #2.3 (1974)

In popular culture
The Tower of Power referenced The Stylistics in their song, "Sexy Soul" from their 1995 album, "Souled Out." The song was written by Emilio Castillo and Steve Kupka.

The song 'People Make The World Go Around' was used in a first season episode (#6) of the Luke Cage TV series, 'Suckas Need Bodyguards'.

See also
List of soul musicians
List of R&B musicians
List of disco artists (S-Z)
List of people from Philadelphia, Pennsylvania
Music of Philadelphia
List of artists who reached number one on the UK Singles Chart
List of guests appearing on The Midnight Special
List of performers on Top of the Pops

References

External links
 Official website

African-American musical groups
American soul musical groups
Vocal quintets
Musical groups established in 1968
Musical groups from Philadelphia
Philadelphia International Records artists
Ballad music groups
Avco Records artists